Antonina Ivanovna Abarinova (24 July 1842, Vladimir – 29 July 1901, Sukhodol, Tula Governorate, Imperial Russia) was a Russian Empire opera singer (originally contralto, later mezzo-soprano) who performed at Maryinsky Theatre, while being also an Alexandrinsky Theatre actress.

Abarinova's best-known operatic roles were as the Princess in Rusalka and Laura in The Stone Guest, both by Alexander Dargomyzhsky, as well as Spiridonova in Alexander Serov's The Power of the Fiend and Lady Pamela in Daniel Auber's Fra Diavolo. In theatre she excelled as Natalya Dmitriyevna in Alexander Griboyedov's Woe from Wit, Zvezdintseva in The Fruits of Enlightenment by Leo Tolstoy, Gurmyzhskaya in The Forest and Ogudalova in Without a Dowry, both by Aleksandr Ostrovsky. She played Polina Andreyevna in the 1896 premiere performance of Anton Chekhov's The Seagull.

References 

1842 births
1901 deaths
Opera singers from the Russian Empire
Actresses from the Russian Empire
People from Vladimir, Russia
Burials at Nikolskoe Cemetery
19th-century actresses from the Russian Empire
Russian stage actresses
19th-century women opera singers from the Russian Empire